Paul Reddicliffe  (born 17 March 1945) was British Ambassador to the Kingdom of Cambodia (1994–1997).

Life
Paul Reddicliffe was born on 17 March 1945.  He was educated at Bedford Modern School, Jesus College, Oxford, and SOAS, University of London.

Reddicliffe joined HM Diplomatic Service in 1977 and was Indochina Analyst (1977–85), First Secretary in Canberra (1985–89), Indochina Analyst (1989–92), Head of Southeast Asia Section (1992–94) and Ambassador to the Kingdom of Cambodia (1994–97). He was invested as an Officer of the Order of the British Empire in 1998.

In 1974 Reddicliffe married Wee Siok Boi; they have two sons.

References

People educated at Bedford Modern School
1945 births
Living people
Officers of the Order of the British Empire
Members of HM Diplomatic Service
20th-century British diplomats